The Coupe de France's results of the 1960–61 season. UA Sedan-Torcy won the final played on May 13, 1961, beating Nîmes Olympique.

Round of 16

Quarter-finals

Semi-finals

Final

References

French federation

1960–61 domestic association football cups
1960–61 in French football
1960-61